Jet, Jets, or The Jet(s) may refer to:

Aerospace 
 Jet aircraft, an aircraft propelled by jet engines
 Jet airliner
 Jet engine
 Jet fuel
 Jet Airways, an Indian airline
 Wind Jet (ICAO: JET), an Italian airline
 Journey to Enceladus and Titan (JET), a proposed astrobiology orbiter to Saturn
 Jet pack, a backpack personal flying device containing a jet motor
 Fighter jet, a military aircraft

Aircraft 
 Business jet
 Boeing Business Jet
 Cessna CitationJet/M2
 Very light jet
 Cirrus Vision SF50, originally called "The-Jet by Cirrus"
 Eclipse 400, originally called "Eclipse Concept Jet"
 Honda HA-420 HondaJet
 Piper PA-47 PiperJet

Other areas of science, math, and technology 
 Jet (fluid), a coherent stream of fluid that is projected into a surrounding medium, usually from some kind of a nozzle or aperture
 Jet (mathematics), an operation on a differentiable function
 Jet (particle physics), a narrow cone of hadrons and other particles produced by the hadronization of a quark or gluon
 Jet bundle, a fiber bundle of jets in differential topology
 Jet group, a group of jets in differential topology
 Jet stream, in meteorology, commonly referred to as "jet"
 Astrophysical jet, in astrophysics, a stream of matter emitted along the axis of a rotating astronomical body
 Joint European Torus, an experimental nuclear fusion machine
 Junctional ectopic tachycardia, a rare cardiac arrhythmia that sometimes occurs after surgery in infants

People 
 Jet (name), given name, generally feminine in Dutch, masculine in English
 Jet Li (born 1963), Chinese film actor, producer and martial artist
 Kenny "the Jet" Smith (born 1965), American basketball commentator and former player
 Benny Urquidez (born 1952), kickboxer, choreographer and actor known as "The Jet"
 Jason Eugene Terry (born 1977), American basketball player nicknamed "JET"
 Jay Emmanuel-Thomas (born 1990), English association football player nicknamed "JET"
 Jet (Diane Youdale, born 1970), one of the stars of Gladiators
 Jet (Monica Carlson), Women's Champion of the first season of American Gladiators

Fictional characters 
 Jet (DC Comics), a comic book character from New Guardians
 The Jets, a gang in the 1957 Broadway musical West Side Story
 Jet Alone, a character from the Neon Genesis Evangelion anime series
 Jet Black, a character from the anime Cowboy Bebop, see List of Cowboy Bebop characters
 Jet Fusion, a cartoon character from The Adventures of Jimmy Neutron: Boy Genius
 Jet Jackson, from the 1950s TV show Jet Jackson, Flying Commando
 Jett Jackson, from the 1999–2001 TV show The Famous Jett Jackson
 Jet Jaguar, a character from the 1973 film Godzilla vs. Megalon
 Jet Link (Cyborg 002), a character from Cyborg 009
 Jet the Hawk, a character in the Sonic the Hedgehog franchise video games and comics
 Jet Vac, a video game character from the Skylanders universe; see Skylanders Academy
 Jet, a fictional dog in the Famous Five book Five on a Secret Trail
 Jet, a character from the cartoon Avatar: The Last Airbender
 Jett, a playable video game character from Valorant

Arts and entertainment 
 Jet, an alternate name for Ground Control, a 1998 American thriller
 Jet (video game), a 1985 fighter-jet simulation game

Music

Albums and songs
 The Jets (album), an album by Minnesota band The Jets
 Jet (album), a 1997 album by Katell Keineg
 "Jet" (song), a 1974 single by Paul McCartney & Wings
 "Jet (Jet, My Love)", a song by Nat King Cole
 "Jet", a song by Basement from Further Sky

Music groups
 Jet (Australian band), an Australian rock band with the Cester brothers
 Jet (UK band), a one-album British glam rock band from London, active 1974–1976, and afterward re-formed as Radio Stars
 The Jets, a Trinidadian band with Lynn Taitt
 The Jets (Dutch band), a Dutch pop group of the 1960s
 The Jets (Minnesota band), an American pop, R&B, dance, and religious-music band
 The Jets (British band), rockabilly band, who had a hit single in February 1982 with "Love Makes The World Go Round"
 The Jets (Illinois band), an American 1970s rock band from Pekin, Illinois
 J.E.T., an Italian-progressive-rock band related to Matia Bazar
 JETS, an electronic music duo consisting of Jimmy Edgar and Travis Stewart

Organizations 
 JETS, the Junior Engineering Technical Society, a national non-profit educational organization to promote engineering and technology careers to youth
 JETS, abbreviation for the Jewish Educational Trade School, a technical college and high school for young Jewish men
 Jet Propulsion Laboratory
 Jordan Evangelical Theological Seminary

Businesses 
 Jet (brand), a filling-station brand name
 Jet (video game), a 1985 fighter-jet simulation game
 Jet Records, a record label
 JET TV, abbreviated name for Japan Entertainment Television
 Jet's Pizza, an American pizza franchise restaurant
 Jet.com, an e-commerce retail site owned by Walmart
 Java Emitter Templates
 Access Database Engine, a Microsoft database engine formerly referred to as Jet Red where JET referred to "Joint Engine Technology"

Magazines 
 Jet (magazine), an African-American-themed magazine
 JET, abbreviated title for the Journal of Economic Theory, an academic journal in the field of economics
 JETS, abbreviated title for the Journal of the Evangelical Theological Society, a refereed theological journal
 Journal of Evolution and Technology

Sports teams 
 Delhi Jets, a cricket team from Indian Cricket League
 Ipswich Jets, an Australian rugby league team
 New York Jets, an American football team
 Newcastle United Jets, an Australian association football club
 Newtown Jets, an Australian rugby league team
 Winnipeg Jets, a professional ice hockey team
 Winnipeg Jets (1972–96), a former professional ice hockey team

Other uses 
 Jet (gemstone), a black or brown semi-precious mineraloid
 Jet, Oklahoma, United States of America
 Jet of Iada (1942–1949), Dickin Medal-winning dog
 JET Programme, the Japan Exchange and Teaching Programme (teaching English)
 Jet, type of nozzle, used on gas cookers and many other applications
 Jets, a form of upper-atmospheric lightning
 Matra Djet (Matra Sports Jet), a French sports car
 Access Database Engine, a Microsoft database engine formerly referred to as Jet Red
 Samsung Jet, a mobile-phone handset

See also 
 
 
 Jett (disambiguation)